Aesopus obesus is a species of sea snail, a marine gastropod mollusc in the family Columbellidae, the dove snails.

Description
The size of an adult shell varies between 5 mm and 14 mm.

Distribution
This species occurs in the Caribbean Sea and the Lesser Antilles; in the Pacific Ocean from Colombia to Argentina in the Atlantic Ocean.

References

 Monsecour K. & Monsecour D. (2007) The Aesopus (Lavesopus) spiculus species complex in the tropical Indo-Pacific (Mollusca, Caenogastropoda, Columbellidae). Visaya 2(2): 57–61. [November 2007]
 Monsecour K. (2010). Checklist of Columbellidae

External links
 

Columbellidae
Gastropods described in 1844